The Burning World is a 1964 science fiction novel by British author J. G. Ballard. An expanded version, retitled The Drought, was first published in 1965 by Jonathan Cape.

Plot  
In contrast to Ballard's earlier novel The Drowned World, The Burning World describes a world in which water is scarce. After an extensive drought, rivers have turned to trickles and the earth to dust, causing the world's populations to head toward the oceans in search of water. The drought is caused by industrial waste flushed into the ocean, which form an oxygen-permeable barrier of saturated long-chain polymers that prevents evaporation and destroys the precipitation cycle.

The main focus of the book is on the surrealistic landscapes forming a changing setting symbolising the developing psychological conflicts and alienation of the principal character.

References

External links

The Terminal Collection: JG Ballard First Editions

1964 British novels
1964 science fiction novels
1965 British novels
Berkley Books books
British post-apocalyptic novels
Climate change novels
Jonathan Cape books
Novels by J. G. Ballard
Water scarcity in fiction